The Minister of State at the Department of Housing, Local Government and Heritage is a junior ministerial post in the Department of Housing, Local Government and Heritage of the Government of Ireland who may perform functions delegated by the Minister for Housing, Local Government and Heritage. A Minister of State does not hold cabinet rank.

There are currently two Ministers of State, who were appointed in 2022:
Kieran O'Donnell, TD – Minister of State for Local Government and Planning
Malcolm Noonan, TD – Minister of State for Heritage and Electoral Reform

List of Parliamentary Secretaries

List of Ministers of State

References

Housing
Department of Housing, Local Government and Heritage